Arca Continental is a Mexican multinational company that produces, distributes, and markets beverages under The Coca-Cola Company brand, as well as snacks under the Bokados brand in Mexico, Inalecsa in Ecuador and Wise and Deep River in the United States. 

Arca Continental is the second-largest Coca-Cola bottler in Latin America. Through its Coca-Cola franchise. The company serves more than 123 million people in the Northern and Western regions of Mexico as well as in Ecuador, Peru, in the Northern region of Argentina and in the Southwestern regions of United States.

History

Arca Continental
Arca Continental, was created in 2001 as a merger of three of the oldest bottlers in Mexico: Argos, Arma, and Procor. This merger created the second-largest Coca-Cola bottler in Mexico. At that time, the company distributed its products in Northern Mexico.

Merger with Continental
In 2011, Arca and Grupo Continental —a Coca-Cola bottler headquartered in Tampico, Tamaulipas—agreed to merge into Arca Continental. Estimates at the time of the merger suggested that sales would be about 1.2bn.

Acquisitions
Embotelladoras Arca Continental fuel its growth during the 2000s by acquiring companies in Mexico, Argentina, and Ecuador. In 2017, Arca Continental announced the closing of a transaction with The Coca-Cola Company to acquire Great Plains Coca-Cola Bottling Company. This acquisition operates in some areas of the Southwestern United States, including the Texas, parts of Oklahoma, New Mexico, and Arkansas. In May 2018, Arca Continental announced the construction of the first new bottling plant in the United States in over a decade. The new $250 million plant has been fully operational since March 2020.

References

External links

Factsheet 2020

Drink companies of Mexico
Coca-Cola bottlers
Companies listed on the Mexican Stock Exchange
Manufacturing companies based in Monterrey